Ramayan Tiwari was a   Bollywood  actor who was more famous by his surname Tiwari. He worked in  approximately 125 movies in his 36 year long film career. He has worked in Bollywood movies like Madhumati, Yahudi, Jis Desh Mein Ganga Behti Hai, Mera Saaya, Kal Aaj Aur Kal and many more. He died on 9 March 1980 in Mumbai. His son's name was Bhushan Tiwari, who too worked in bollywood movies as a character artist.

Early life 
Ramayana Tiwari was born in a farming family of Maner in  Patna, Bihar.

Career 
In Mumbai, firstly he got a job in a studio named 'Prabhat Studio' where many films were photographed. Once, shooting of a movie named Man Mandir was going on in the studio in which a character artist was absent one day. Consequently, the director of the movie offered Tiwari the same role which he joyfully accepted. This was his first movie. Later, he acted in many many big movies like Bimal Roy's Madhumati, Yahudi etc., Raj Kapoor's Jis Desh Mein Ganga Behti Hai, Kal Aaj Aur Kal, Raj Khosla's Mera Saaya and many more movies.

Filmography

References 

1980 deaths
Male actors in Hindi cinema
People from Patna district
Male actors from Patna
Indian male film actors
20th-century Indian male actors